Caraquet Rock is a rock lying nearly  west-southwest of Bell Point, off the west part of King George Island in the South Shetland Islands. It was named by the UK Antarctic Place-Names Committee in 1960 for the sealing vessel Caraquet (Captain J. Usher) from Liverpool, which visited the South Shetland Islands in 1821–22.

References 

Rock formations of King George Island (South Shetland Islands)